R6 or R-6 may refer to:
 Line R6, a commuter rail service on the Llobregat–Anoia Line, in Barcelona, Catalonia, Spain
 Radial Road 6 or R-6, an arterial road of Manila, Philippines
 R6 assault rifle, a South African shortened version of the R4 assault rifle
 Renault 6
 R6 battery, a carbon-zinc battery in the AA size. See List of battery sizes
 R6 implant, a type of implant in Scientology doctrine
 R6 (New York City Subway car), a model of New York City Subway rolling stock manufactured from 1935 to 1936
 R6 (SEPTA), a former commuter rail line in Philadelphia, Pennsylvania, which has been split into:
 Cynwyd Line (R6 Cynwyd)
 Manayunk/Norristown Line (R6 Norristown)
 R6: Explosive with or without contact with air, a risk phrase in chemistry
 Caudron R.6, a French reconnaissance aircraft of World War I
 R6 expressway (Czech Republic), a road in Czech Republic
 R6 expressway (Slovakia)
 Regjeringskvartalet or R6, a building under construction as part of the Norwegian Government quarter (Norw. Regjeringskvartalet) 
 Ross R-6 glider
 Tupolev R-6, a Soviet multi- role reconnaissance fighter
 USS R-6 (SS-83), a 1919 R-class coastal and harbor defense submarine of the United States Navy
 Yamaha YZF-R6, a 600cc Yamaha supersport-class motorcycle
 Air Srpska IATA code defunct
 Rainbow Six (disambiguation), a Tom Clancy video game series and book, is sometimes abbreviated as R6
 RACSA (airline) IATA code
 Sikorsky R-6 helicopter
 R6 (cigarette), a German brand
 R6, a multi-tenant Business Support System (BSS) of Infonova
 Canon EOS R6, a Canon full-frame mirrorless interchangeable-lens camera]
 Region 6, the DVD region code for People's Republic of China, Hong Kong, North Korea
 receptor 6, the sixth in line of a series of cellular receptors, generally at the end of an acronym

R06 may refer to:
 HMS Illustrious (R06), a 1976 Invincible-class British Royal Navy light aircraft carrier
 ATC code R06 Antihistamines for systemic use, a subgroup of the Anatomical Therapeutic Chemical Classification System